Club Deportivo y Mutual Leandro N. Alem is an Argentine football club, located in General Rodríguez, Buenos Aires Province. The team currently plays in Primera C, the fourth division of the Argentine football league system.

The club was founded in 1925 by a group of dairy workers, and because of that, it was soon nicknamed El Lechero (The Milkman) although its denomination honoured Leandro Nicéforo Alem, an Argentine politician who was the founder and leader of the Unión Cívica Radical and also the uncle and political teacher of former President of Argentina Hipólito Yrigoyen.

Leando N. Alem used wears a uniform  that is very similar to Boca Juniors, Argentina's most popular football team.

In the 2001 Primera C Metropolitana Clausura tournament the club set an Argentine record for the worst performance in a short season. They obtained only 1 point from 17 games, which led to their relegation to Primera D.

Team 2022 
As of 13 February 2022:

Titles
Primera C: 1
 1924
Primera D: 2
 1957, 2006–07

See also
List of football clubs in Argentina
Argentine football league system

References

 
Association football clubs established in 1925
Football clubs in Buenos Aires Province
General Rodríguez Partido
1924 establishments in Argentina